is the 2008 sequel to the Japanese anime television series Shugo Chara! Like its predecessor, Shugo Chara!! Doki— is loosely based on Peach-Pit's award-winning manga series Shugo Chara! and is produced by Satelight under the direction of Kenji Yasuda. The second season features new characters such as Lulu de Morcerf, a new employee for the Easter Company who uses her mysterious ruby necklace to corrupt people's dreams by turning their Heart's Eggs into ? Eggs causing them to wreak havoc.

The first episode, was first broadcast on TV Tokyo in Japan on October 4, 2008, where the series continues to air. The episodes are rebroadcast by TV Aichi, TV Hokkaido, TV Osaka, TV Setouchi, and TVQ Kyushu Broadcasting within a few days of the initial broadcast.

Several pieces of theme music are used over the course of the series—two opening themes by Shugo Chara Egg! and two closing themes by J-pop group Buono!. The opening theme , which is from episode 77 to episode 89, is by the newest group, Guardians 4. The opening theme from episodes 90 to 102 is "School Days", also performed by Guardians 4. The ending theme from episode 77 to 89 is "My Boy", which is also performed by Buono!. The ending theme from episode 90 to 101, is "Take It Easy!", again performed by Buono!. Episode 102 ends with "Honto no Jibun", originally shown as the first ending theme to the first season.

Episode list


See also 
 List of Shugo Chara! episodes (01-51)
 List of Shugo Chara Party! episodes (103-127)

References
 General

 
 
 
 

 Specific

2008 Japanese television seasons
2009 Japanese television seasons
Doki